Locha hyalina is a moth species in the family Geometridae from Central and parts of South America. It was described by Dru Drury in 1782, but his name Phalaena diaphana was invalid as pre-occupied (see Eloria diaphana).

Description
Upperside: Antennae pectinated (comb like). Thorax brown. Abdomen black, brown above. Wings diaphanous, the edges being bordered with black, a black band also crosses the anterior, from the anterior edges to the lower corners.

Underside: Tongue spiral. Breast and legs black. Abdomen grey. Anus yellowish. Wings coloured on this side as on the upper. Margins of the wings entire. Wingspan  inches (44 mm).

References

Ennominae
Moths described in 1782
Descriptions from Illustrations of Exotic Entomology